Mathias is an unincorporated community along the Lost River in Hardy County in the U.S. state of West Virginia. Mathias lies off West Virginia Route 259. Before the consolidated school of East Hardy High School at Baker, Mathias had its own educational facility, Mathias School, which served grades kindergarten through twelfth.

Mathias has one bank (Summit Community Bank), one restaurant, a post office, a new garage, one community center, one gas station, as well as Lost River State Park. It was founded by John Mathias and contains his historic homestead, the John Mathias House.

Climate
The climate in this area is characterized by hot, humid summers and generally mild to cool winters.  According to the Köppen Climate Classification system, Mathias has a humid subtropical climate, abbreviated "Cfa" on climate maps.

References

Unincorporated communities in Hardy County, West Virginia
Unincorporated communities in West Virginia